Epiparactis is a genus of sea anemones of the family Actinoscyphiidae. It currently includes only one species.

Species 
The following species are recognized:

Distribution
This species was described from 1461 m depth at Ingolf Station 78, SW of Iceland, North Atlantic.

References 

Actinoscyphiidae
Hexacorallia genera